The 6th Annual NFL Honors was the awards presentation by the National Football League that honored its best players from the 2016 NFL season. It was held on February 4, 2017 and aired on Fox in the United States at 8:00 PM EST. It was hosted by Keegan-Michael Key.

List of award winners

References

NFL Honors 006
2016 National Football League season
2017 in American football
2017 in sports in Texas
2017 in Houston